Vietnam competed at the 2022 World Aquatics Championships in Budapest, Hungary from 17 June to 3 July.

Swimming

Vietnam entered nine swimmers.

Men

Women

Mixed

References

Nations at the 2022 World Aquatics Championships
Vietnam at the World Aquatics Championships
2022 in Vietnamese sport